The CTG Collective is a not-for-profit art organization.

The Collective was founded by Rachel Monosov, Catinca Tabacaru and Justin Orvis Steimer.

List of residencies
CTG(R): ZImbabwe, 2015
 Participants: Virginia Chihota, Admire Kamudzengerere, Rachel Monosov, Terrence Musekiwa, Gareth Nyandoro, Xavier Robles de Medina, Justin Orvis Steimer

CTG(R): NewFoundland, 2016
 Participants: Rachel Monosov, Terrence Musekiwa, Yapci Ramos and Justin Orvis Steimer, in collaboration with Pool’s Island descendant Matthew Evans

Exhibitions
 1972: Rachel Monosov and Admire Kamudzengerere
 TERRA NOVA: Rachel Monosov, Terrence Musekiwa, Yapci Ramos, Justin Orvis Steimer
 Zig Zag Zim: Part II: Admire Kamudzengerere, Rachel Monosov, Terrence Musekiwa, Xavier Robles de Medina, Justin Orvis Steimer
 Zig Zag Zim: Virginia Chihota, Admire Kamudzengerere, Rachel Monosov, Terrence Musekiwa, Xavier Robles de Medina, Justin Orvis Steimer
 National Gallery of Zimbabwe, Harare (2016)

References

External links
 CTG Collective Website
 Catinca Tabacaru Gallery website

Arts organizations